Four Thieves Gone: The Robbinsville Sessions is the fourth album by American folk rock band The Avett Brothers released on February 7, 2006 on the Ramseur Records label. The album was recorded in a rented house in Robbinsville, North Carolina over the course of 10 days in early 2005 and saw the introduction of electric guitar and heavier drums to the band's sound. The album features several songs written and performed in collaboration with Paleface.

The album was titled Four Thieves Gone after Scott Avett realized their song "Denouncing November Blue" sounded identical to the Charlie Daniels song "Uneasy Rider", whom they ultimately credited with the songwriting.

Track listing

Personnel
The Avett Brothers are:

Scott Avett – vocals, banjo, piano, percussion, guitars
Seth Avett – vocals, guitars, piano, percussion
Bob Crawford – double bass, vocals

Special Guests:
Paleface – harmonica, rhythm guitar, melodica, voice
Sarah Avett – violin on "The Lowering (A Sad Day In Greenvilletown)" and "40 East"

Charts

References

The Avett Brothers albums
2006 albums